Philippus Harco "Flip" Keegstra (20 June 1914, Amsterdam – 9 May 1991, Amsterdam) was a sailor from the Netherlands, who represented his native country as  at the 1948 Summer Olympics in Torbay. Keegstra, as crew member on the Dutch Swallow St. Margrite, took the 11th place with helmsman Wim de Vries Lentsch. In 1952 Keegstra returns to the Olympics, Helsinki, in the 5.5 Metre De Ruyter. With Helmsman Wim de Vries Lentsch and fellow crew member Piet Jan van der Giessen they took the 13th place.

Sources
 
 
 
 
 
 

1914 births
1991 deaths
Sportspeople from Amsterdam
Dutch male sailors (sport)

Sailors at the 1948 Summer Olympics – Swallow
Sailors at the 1952 Summer Olympics – 5.5 Metre
Olympic sailors of the Netherlands
20th-century Dutch people